Andrew Jacobs (February 22, 1906 – December 17, 1992) was a lawyer, judge, and Congressman for one term, in Indiana. His son, Andrew Jacobs Jr., was also a Congressman.

Biography
Jacobs attended the public schools near his birthplace (Gerald, Indiana), and later attended St. Benedict's College, Atchison, Kansas. He graduated from Ben Harrison Law School, in Indianapolis in 1928. He served as public defender in Marion County Felony Court, 1930–33. 

In 1948 he was elected as a Democrat to the Eighty-first United States Congress (January 3, 1949 – January 3, 1951). He was an unsuccessful candidate for reelection in 1950. He was a delegate to the Democratic National Conventions in 1952 and 1956. He was served as judge, criminal court of Marion County, 1975–77, and was a resident of Indianapolis, until his death in 1992.

Sources

1906 births
1992 deaths
Politicians from Indianapolis
People from Perry County, Indiana
Indiana state court judges
Indiana lawyers
Democratic Party members of the United States House of Representatives from Indiana
20th-century American lawyers
20th-century American politicians
20th-century American judges
Public defenders